Major-General Sir James Murray Irwin  (13 February 1858 – 7 November 1938) was a British physician. He served as a British Army doctor in Sudan, the Second Boer War and World War I.

Early life
He was born in Manorcunningham, County Donegal, Ireland. In 1875, he studied medicine at Trinity College Dublin.

Career
Irwin joined the Royal Army Medical Corps at Netley in 1881 and was commissioned as surgeon captain posted to Dublin in February 1882. He was posted to India in September 1883.

He was subsequently posted to Dublin in 1890, Gibraltar in 1891 and Brighton in 1897.

In February 1894, he was promoted to surgeon major .

He was posted to Brighton in 1897 and then to Sudan. He was a Medical Officer in Atbara during the Battle of Omdurman 1898. He was posted to the expedition in Crete 1899. He served as Medical Officer on troopship HMS Verona and then to Dublin, also in 1899.

Irwin was posted to South Africa in 1900, for service during the Second Boer War, and was promoted to lieutenant colonel on 4 February 1902. Following the end of hostilities in June 1902, he left Cape Town for England and returned to Southampton in early August.

He was then posted to Aldershot, and became Assistant to Surgeon General McNamara in 1903.

He was posted to the War Office as Assistant Director General 1906, and to Tientsin in 1910.

He was romoted to Colonel and sent to Hong Kong as deputy director of Medical Services in 1911.

He travelled around the world in 1913.

He returned to London and established King George V Hospital, at Waterloo in 1914. In France he served as Deputy Director of Medical Services, Rouen in 1915. He was Director of Medical Services for the 3rd Army in 1916.

He was promoted to Temporary Surgeon General April 1916 and returned to England in 1919.

After World War I he retired to Bideford, North Devon.

Family
He married Nora Conlan, daughter of Thomas Conlan, Q.C., of Allahabad, 26 July 1884 and they had a daughter Edna Florinek born 31 October 1885.

References

Sources

External links
 Entry in King's College London Liddell Hart Centre for Military Archives

1858 births
1938 deaths
British Army generals of World War I
British Army personnel of the Mahdist War
British Army personnel of the Second Boer War
British military personnel of the 1898 Occupation of Crete
Companions of the Order of the Bath
Knights Commander of the Order of St Michael and St George
People from County Donegal
Royal Army Medical Corps officers